Tsumeb Airport  is an airport serving Tsumeb, a town in the Oshikoto Region of Namibia. The airport is just east of the town. Tsumeb is the location of a former mining operation and is the closest town to the Etosha National Park.

The Tsumeb non-directional beacon (Ident: TM) is located on the field.

See also
List of airports in Namibia
Transport in Namibia

References

External links
 
OurAirports - Tsumeb
OpenStreetMap - Tsumeb

Airports in Namibia
Buildings and structures in Oshikoto Region
Tsumeb